Aarif Sheikh (born 5 October 1997) is a Nepalese cricketer, who was the vice-captain of the Nepal national under-19 cricket team, and currently plays for the senior team. All-rounder Aarif is a right-handed batsman and a right-arm medium pace bowler. He made his debut for Nepal against Hong Kong in May 2014.

He represents the APF Club of the National League and GoldenGate International College, which plays in the SPA Cup. He was one of the eleven cricketers to play in Nepal's first ever One Day International (ODI) match, against the Netherlands, in August 2018.

His younger brother, Aasif Sheikh, has played for the Nepal under-19 cricket team. Aarif has been known for guiding his younger brother as a mentor in their childhood. In the final of the 2016 Everest Premier League, Aasif scored 111* eventually helping his team Panchakanya Tej to win the title.

Career

Early career
Aarif first represented Nepal Under-19s in the 2014 ACC Under-19 Asia Cup in December 2013. He scored 25 runs against Pakistan, 40 runs against India and 48 runs against UAE in the tournament.

In the national one day tournament held in Kathmandu, he was named Player of the Tournament where he scored a total of 261 runs with an average of 52.20 and picked up 11 wickets.

Following his impressive performances in the national tournament, he was selected in the national squad for the 2014 ACC Premier League. Playing his debut match for Nepal, he picked up 2 wickets against Hong Kong where he also bowled the Hong Kong captain Jamie Atkinson. He also picked up 2 wickets in the match against Afghanistan.

He went to India along with his teammate Karan KC in September 2014 for a 10-day training at Just Cricket Academy in Bangalore before participating in the 2014 ICC World Cricket League Division Three tournament.

He represented Nepal Under-19s in the 2014 ACC Under-19 Premier League, where he was the second leading run scorer. He scored 190 runs in 5 innings at an average of 38.00. He made List A debut in 2015 ICC World Cricket League Division Two in Namibia in January 2015.

2018-present
In January 2018, he was named in Nepal's squad for the 2018 ICC World Cricket League Division Two tournament.

In July 2018, he was named in Nepal's squad for their One Day International (ODI) series against the Netherlands. These were Nepal's first ODI matches since gaining ODI status during the 2018 Cricket World Cup Qualifier. He made his Twenty20 debut for Nepal in the 2018 MCC Tri-Nation Series against the Marylebone Cricket Club on 29 July 2018. He made his Twenty20 International (T20I) on the same day, against the Netherlands. He made his ODI debut for Nepal against the Netherlands on 1 August 2018.

In August 2018, he was named in Nepal's squad for the 2018 Asia Cup Qualifier tournament. In October 2018, he was named in Nepal's squad in the Eastern sub-region group for the 2018–19 ICC World Twenty20 Asia Qualifier tournament.

He made his first-class debut on 6 November 2019, for Nepal against the Marylebone Cricket Club (MCC), during the MCC's tour of Nepal. Later the same month, he was named in Nepal's squads for the 2019 ACC Emerging Teams Asia Cup in Bangladesh, and the men's cricket tournament at the 2019 South Asian Games. The Nepal team won the bronze medal, after they beat the Maldives by five wickets in the third-place playoff match. In September 2020, he was one of eighteen cricketers to be awarded with a central contract by the Cricket Association of Nepal.

References

External links
 

1997 births
Living people
Nepalese cricketers
Nepal One Day International cricketers
Nepal Twenty20 International cricketers
People from Birgunj
South Asian Games bronze medalists for Nepal
South Asian Games medalists in cricket